Kishavisheh-ye Olya (also Romanized as Kīshāvīsheh-ye ‘Olyā; also known as Keshāvosheh Bālā and Keshāvosheh ‘Olyā) is a village in Tula Rud Rural District, in the Central District of Talesh County, Gilan Province, Iran. At the 2006 census, its population was 1,087, in 238 families.

References 

Populated places in Talesh County